Chehel Dokhtaran or Cheheldokhtaran may refer to:
 Chehel Dokhtaran, Kohgiluyeh and Boyer-Ahmad
 Chehel Dokhtaran, North Khorasan